Like Never Before is an album by the American blues artist Taj Mahal, released in 1991.

Track listing
 "Don't Call Us" (Richard Feldman, Taj Mahal)
 "River of Love" (Jimmy Scott, Porter Carroll, Richard Feldman)
 "Scattered" (Mark Jordan, Mark Pearson, Reed Nielson)
 "Ev'ry Wind (In the River)" (Mark Jordan, Patrick Dollaghan, Richard Feldman, Taj Mahal)
 "Blues with a Feeling" (Walter Jacobs)
 "Squat That Rabbit" (Joe Nicolo, Taj Mahal)
 "Take All the Time You Need" (Jerry Williams)
 "Love Up" (John Martyn)
 "Cakewalk Into Town" (Taj Mahal)
 "Big Legged Mommas Are Back in Style" (Taj Mahal)
 "Take a Giant Step" (Gerry Goffin, Carole King)

References

Taj Mahal (musician) albums
1991 albums
Private Music albums